Khazalabad (also Romanized as Khaz‘alābād; also known as Bahmanbār) is a village in Minubar Rural District, Arvandkenar District, Abadan County, Khuzestan Province, Iran. At the 2006 census, its population was 612, in 128 families.

References 

Populated places in Abadan County